Angarsk is a city and the administrative center of Angarsky District of Irkutsk Oblast, Russia, located on the Kitoy River,  from Irkutsk, the administrative center of the oblast. Population:

History
It was founded in 1948 as an industrial community and was granted city status on May 30, 1951.

Administrative and municipal status
Within the framework of administrative divisions, Angarsk serves as the administrative center of Angarsky District, to which it is directly subordinated. As a municipal division, the city of Angarsk and thirteen rural localities of Angarsky District are incorporated as Angarskoye Urban Okrug.

Local government
As a result of the elections of December 2, 2007, Leonid G. Mikhaylov was elected mayor. Previously, Yevgeny P. Kanukhin, elected on October 9, 2005, was mayor.

Economy

Angarsk has the largest industrial zone in Asia. It includes Angarsk Petrochemical Complex and Angarsk Electrochemical Combine. Angarsk also hosts a showcase international nuclear fuel cycle center, which will be one of the first Russian enrichment centers to be placed under IAEA safeguards. Angarsk is also the site for a Nuclear Fuel Bank, following a decision by the IAEA in November 2009; working with Russia, IAEA established this bank to supply market priced fuel to member states as protection against possible supply disruptions.

In 2005, Angarsk won the first prize in a nationwide contest for the fastest development of public utilities.

Transportation

The city is connected by the Trans-Siberian Railway. Trams, buses, and marshrutkas (routed taxis) are the main means of public transportation in the city.

Culture and education
The city is home to the Angarsk Museum of Clocks and Watches, the Angarsk Museum of Victory, and the Angarsk State Technical Academy.

People
 Mikhail Popkov, one of Russia's most violent serial killers, was born in Angarsk.
 Roman Popov, former professional ice hockey player
 Ekaterina Tyryshkina, footballer playing for En Avant de Guingamp (women)

Twin towns and sister cities

Angarsk is twinned with:
 Mytishchi, Russia
 Jinzhou, China
 Komatsu, Japan
 Alushta, Ukraine

References

Notes

Sources

Registry of the Administrative-Territorial Formations of Irkutsk Oblast

External links
Official website of Angarsk 
Directory of organizations in Angarsk 

Cities and towns in Irkutsk Oblast
Populated places established in 1948
Cities and towns built in the Soviet Union